UK-Belgium 5 was a submarine communications cable linking the UK and Belgium. It was the first international undersea cable system to use optical fibres rather than coaxial cable.

The cable was laid in 1986. It was owned by a consortium which included British Telecom. The cable was manufactured by Standard Telephones and Cables.

The cable had 3 repeaters and had 3 pairs of optic fibres, each operating at 280 Mbit/s giving a total capacity of 11,520 x 64kbit/s circuits.

See also
 List of international submarine communications cables

References

Submarine communications cables in the North Sea
Belgium–United Kingdom relations
British Telecom buildings and structures
1986 establishments in Belgium
1986 establishments in England